Jungle Run is a British children's television adventure series that aired on CITV as part of the ITV network from 10 September 1999 to 29 November 2006. It was a game show similar to shows such as Fort Boyard and The Crystal Maze. The show has had three presenters, referred to as the "Jungle Guide": Dominic Wood from 1999 to 2000, Chris Jarvis from 2001 to 2002 and Michael Underwood from 2003 to 2006. It was recorded at the disused air base, RAF Newton, near Nottingham.

Format
A team of children come upon a mythical jungle ruled by the Jungle King, where the goal is to win treasure from the Temple of the Jungle King. On their way they compete in 5 challenges (3 or 4 in celebrity editions) to win time inside the temple to better their chance of winning the top prize. In the first 2 series, bananas win them time in the final challenge. However, from series 3 onward, these are replaced with silver monkey statues, each one giving them 10 seconds in the final challenge. There was also one golden banana worth 50 bananas, later replaced with a Ruby monkey worth 20 seconds, in each episode, with the total amount of possible time standing at 3:20.

Gameplay
Challenges took place in a variety of locations. Some were swamps or waterfalls; others were obstacle courses or mazes, and some were just places out in the open. The same location could be used for multiple challenges, but each task could only be played in one place.

Usually, 100 bananas or four to five statues were available in each of the challenges. Occasionally, members of the team could be trapped by running out of time in an obstacle course or failing to complete a game involving cages; the rest of the team would then decide if they wanted to forfeit 50 bananas/one (later two) statues to release them, or leave without them and lose no time. If multiple team members are trapped in the same game, one team member can be released for free while each additional team member must be bought out to be released. In some games, Sid and Elvis (a pair of monkeys loyal to the jungle king) would try to distract contestants by throwing coconuts or other objects in their direction.

Games took approximately two to three minutes each, and included challenges such as:
Capturing statues while going down a zipwire.
Discovering bananas/statues in a maze or obstacle course; usually one member of the team would complete the course while others would provide assistance by using tools on the other side of the wall, or provision of guidance from above.
Collecting bananas/statues hanging above a swamp, using lilypads or a bridge.
Climbing up a wall and collecting bananas/statues hidden in ridges.
Diving underwater to get statues hidden in treasure chests.
Filling shrines with water, so statues would float within reach.
Using bamboo poles to hook baskets containing statues.
Finding and using a series of keys to unlock cages where contestants were imprisoned. (Statues were released by using the same keys in a machine.)
Remembering pairs of symbols on a board, and matching the symbols to win bananas/statues.

The Temple of the Jungle King
The final challenge involves contestants making their way through the Temple of the Jungle King, their time inside depending on the number of bananas/statues collected. Inside the temple is a series of rooms each containing a large monkey "sacred idol". Once the challenge in each chamber is completed, the door to the next room opens. In series 1–2, teams would only win one prize based on the chamber they advanced to, but following this, teams won one prize per chamber completed. There were four challenges and one idol for each chamber: Stone, Metal/Bronze, Silver and the Golden Monkey.

When a team has only 10/20 seconds left, a warning sound (a gong, a drum, or a chimp screaming) would be heard, signalling that they should make their way out of the temple. If some members or the entire team fail to get out in time, those people are locked in the temple and receive no prizes. In series 1–2 if anyone got trapped, even those who did get out with an idol received no prizes, but from series 3 onwards, anyone who made it out with an idol would win the prize. Anyone who took part would also receive a consolation prize, such as a t-shirt, backpack or monkey toy (depending on the series). When celebrities played their prizes are given to charity.

Challenges could involve:
Getting a ball in a hole by lifting up and rotating a maze.
Completing a jigsaw.
Each contestant matching their hands and feet to the correct symbols.
Solving an abacus puzzle.
Turning cogs.
Getting across a pit without touching the sand.
Spelling the solution to a riddle by standing on the right tiles.

Transmissions

External links

1999 British television series debuts
2006 British television series endings
1990s British children's television series
2000s British children's television series
British children's game shows
1990s British game shows
2000s British game shows
English-language television shows
ITV children's television shows
Television series about children